William J. Edwards is a United States Army major general who has served as the Deputy Director for Strategic Initiatives of the Joint Staff since January 2021. Previously, he served as the Commander and Senior Military Representative to the NATO Headquarters Sarajevo from December 12, 2019 to January 2021.

References

Living people
Place of birth missing (living people)
Recipients of the Defense Superior Service Medal
Recipients of the Legion of Merit
United States Army generals
United States Army personnel of the Iraq War
Year of birth missing (living people)